Mona Lisa Overdrive is the 13th album by Buck-Tick, released on February 13, 2003. The album title is mistakenly thought to have been inspired by William Gibson's cyberpunk novel of the same name but guitarist Hisashi Imai originally confused it with Robert Longo's work Samurai Overdrive, which inspired the album title. It reached number seven on the Oricon chart with 31,235 copies sold. The album is thematically connected to the previous release, Kyokutou I Love You: the last instrumental song in Kyokutou I Love You gives the musical foundation to the first song in Mona Lisa Overdrive, while the base of the last song of this album recurs in the first song of Kyokutou I Love You.

Track listing

Personnel
Buck-Tick
 Atsushi Sakurai – vocals
 Hisashi Imai – guitar, vocals
 Hidehiko Hoshino – guitar
 Yutaka Higuchi – bass
 Toll Yagami – drums

References 

2003 albums
Buck-Tick albums
Japanese-language albums